The 2009 Central Michigan Chippewas football team represented Central Michigan University during the 2009 NCAA Division I FBS football season.  Central Michigan competed as a member of the Mid-American Conference (MAC) West Division.  The team was coached by Butch Jones and played their home games in Kelly/Shorts Stadium. The Chippewas finished the regular season 10–2 and 8–0 in conference play, beat Ohio in the 2009 MAC Championship Game to win the MAC title and were invited to the GMAC Bowl where they defeated Sun Belt Champion Troy 44–41 in double overtime.

At the end of the season, Jones departed Central Michigan to become the head football coach at the University of Cincinnati. Steve Stripling, the defensive ends coach, became interim head coach and coached the GMAC bowl.

Before the season

Recruiting

Schedule

Roster

Coaching staff

Game summaries

Arizona

Scoring Summary

1st Quarter
 07:17 ARIZ Zendejas 36-yard field goal 3-0 ARIZ
 00:00 ARIZ Zendejas 37-yard field goal 6-0 ARIZ

2nd Quarter
 08:20 ARIZ Grigsby 3-yard run (Zendejas kick) 13-0 ARIZ

3rd Quarter
 00:38 ARIZ Zendejas 37-yard field goal 16-0 ARIZ

4th Quarter
 12:21 CMU LeFevour 5-yard run (LeFevour rush failed) 16-6 ARIZ
 08:45 ARIZ Zendejas 35-yard field goal 19-6 ARIZ

Michigan State

Scoring Summary

1st Quarter
 13:00	MSU Ray 1 Yd Run (Swenson Kick) 7-0 MSU
 09:24	CMU Aguila 49 Yd field goal 7-3 MSU
 03:13	MSU Swenson 39 Yd field goal 10-3 MSU

2nd Quarter
 13:16	CMU Aguila 31 Yd field goal 10-6 MSU
 05:49	CMU Brown 6 Yd Pass From LeFevour (Aguila Kick) 13-10 CMU
 04:16	MSU Gantt 16 Yd Pass From Nichol (Swenson Kick) 17-13 MSU

3rd Quarter
 02:33	MSU Swenson 32 Yd field goal 20-13 MSU

4th Quarter
 14:24	CMU Poblah 12 Yd Pass From LeFevour (Aguila Kick) 20-20
 07:33	MSU Cunningham 7 Yd Pass From Cousins (Swenson Kick) 27-20 MSU
 00:32	CMU Cotton 11 Yd Pass From LeFevour (Two-Point Conversion Failed) 27-26 MSU
 00:03	CMU Aguila 42 Yd field goal 29-27 CMU

Alcorn State

Scoring Summary

1st Quarter
 07:36 CMU Aguila 23-yard field goal CMU 3-0
 05:56 CMU Brown 55-yard punt return (Aguila kick) CMU 10-0

2nd Quarter
 14:51 CMU LeFevour 10-yard run (Aguila kick) CMU 17-0
 11:54 CMU Phillips 2-yard run (Aguila kick) CMU 24-0
 09:12 CMU LeFevour 1-yard run (Aguila kick) CMU 31-0
 05:06 CMU Aguila 32-yard field goal CMU 34-0

3rd Quarter
 14:00 CMU Volny 5-yard run (Aguila kick) CMU 41-0
 00:59 CMU Volny 2-yard run (Hartmann kick) CMU 48-0

4th Quarter

Akron

Scoring Summary

1st Quarter
 7:11 CMU Wilson 27-yard pass from LeFevour (Aguila kick) 0-7 CMU
 5:21 CMU Poblah 4-yard pass from LeFevour (Aguila kick failed) 0-13 CMU

2nd Quarter
 14:39 CMU LeFevour 1-yard run (Aguila kick) 0-20 CMU
 9:59 AKRON Rodgers 10-yard run (Iveljic kick) 7-20 CMU
 6:47 CMU LeFevour 2-yard run (Aguila kick) 7-27 CMU
 1:02 CMU Brown 9-yard pass from LeFevour (Aguila kick) 7-34 CMU

3rd Quarter
 8:42 AKRON Rodgers 1-yard run (Iveljic kick) 14-34 CMU
 3:40 CMU Brown 13-yard pass from LeFevour (Aguila kick) 14-41 CMU

4th Quarter
 9:42 CMU Cotton 3-yard run (Aguila kick) 14-48 CMU
 6:19 AKRON Tuzze 9-yard run (Iveljic kick) 21-48 CMU

Buffalo

Eastern Michigan

Scoring Summary

1st Quarter
 08:51 CMU Brown 70-yard pass from LeFevour (Aguila kick) 0-7 CMU
 03:58 CMU LeFevour 1-yard run (Aguila kick) 0-14 CMU

2nd Quarter
 12:33 CMU LeFevour 1-yard run (Aguila kick) 0-21 CMU
 02:51 CMU Brown 75-yard punt return (Aguila kick) 0-28 CMU
 00:18 CMU Schroeder 11-yard pass from LeFevour (Aguila kick) 0-35 CMU

3rd Quarter
 12:50 CMU Poblah 25-yard pass from LeFevour (Aguila kick) 0-42 CMU
 01:57 CMU LeFevour 5-yard run (Aguila kick) 0-49 CMU

4th Quarter
 11:25 EMU Welch 1-yard run (Gillett rush) 8-49 CMU
 07:36 CMU Volny 3-yard run (Aguila kick) 8-56 CMU

Western Michigan

Bowling Green

Scoring Summary

1st Quarter
 11:04 CMU Brown 4-yard run (Aguila kick) 7-0 CMU

2nd Quarter
 11:26 BGSU Barnes 24-yard pass from Sheehan (Norsic kick) 7-7
 9:16 CMU Brown 29-yard pass from LeFevour (Aguila kick) 14-7 CMU
 0:06 BGSU Norsic 40-yard field goal 14-10 CMU

3rd Quarter
 11:34 CMU Aguila 38-yard field goal 17-10 CMU

4th Quarter
 10:02 CMU Anderson 9-yard pass from LeFevour (Aguila kick) 24-10 CMU

Boston College

Scoring Summary

2nd Quarter
 6:09 CMU Aguila 34-yard field goal 3-0 CMU
 0:50 BC Harris 3-yard run (Aponavicius kick) 3-7 BC

3rd Quarter
 12:03 BC Gunnell 41-yard pass from Shinskie (Aponavicius kick) 3-14 BC
 6:35 BC Harris 3-yard run (Aponavicius kick) 3-21 BC
 1:44 BC Aponavicius 18-yard field goal 3-24 BC

4th Quarter
 5:00 BC Kuechly 28-yard interception return (Aponavicius kick) 3-31 BC
 0:35 CMU Radcliff 11-yard run (Aguila kick) 10-31 BC

Toledo

Ball State

Northern Illinois

Ohio

Troy

This was the first ever meeting between these two teams.

References

Central Michigan
Central Michigan Chippewas football seasons
Mid-American Conference football champion seasons
LendingTree Bowl champion seasons
Central Michigan Chippewas football